Blennidus rufescens is a species of ground beetle in the subfamily Pterostichinae. It was described by Solier in 1849.

References

Blennidus
Beetles described in 1849